Morando is both a given name and a surname. Notable people with the name include:
Morando Morandini (1924–2015), Italian film critic, author, journalist and actor
Bernardo Morando (ca. 1540–1600), Italian architect
Clemente Morando (1899–1972), Italian footballer

See also
Mal morando, a cutaneous condition caused by onchocerciasis